Jimna is a rural town and locality in the Somerset Region, Queensland, Australia.

Geography
Jimna is situated on the Jimna Range approximately 1690 feet (515.11 metres) above sea level.

Jimna Diggings is a neighbourhood in the east of the locality, an area historically used for gold mining.

History
Duungidjawu (also known as Kabi Kabi, Cabbee, Carbi, Gabi Gabi) is an Australian Aboriginal language spoken on Duungidjawu country. The Duungidjawu language region includes the landscape within the local government boundaries of Somerset Region and Moreton Bay Region, particularly the towns of Caboolture, Kilcoy, Woodford and Moore.

The name Jimna is believed to be an Aboriginal word djimna meaning place of leeches.

The first Jimna Post Office opened on 1 July 1868 and closed in 1879. A receiving office was open from 1891 to 1909, and from 1925 until the second Jimna Post Office opened on 1 July 1927. This closed in 1981.

In 1887,  of land were resumed from the Yabba pastoral run for the establishment of small farms. The land was offered for selection on 17 April 1887.

Monsildale Provisional School opened on 2 June 1913. In 1923, the school was moved and renamed Foxlowe Provisional School. On 25 June 1926 it was renamed Jimna Provisional School. On 1 October 1934, it became Jimna State School. It was mothballed on 31 December 2006 and closed on 31 December 2009. (In about 1941, a separate Monsildale State School was opened but closed about 1961.) It was at 21 School Road. The Jimna school site was developed as a camping ground retaining the school buildings and other facilities. The school's website was archived.
 
Commercial loggers Hancock and Gore moved their sawmill from Monsildale to what would become Jimna in 1922.  The sawmill was burnt down by fire in 1947.

The state government established a hoop pine nursery at Jimna in 1935.  Jimna hall was opened in 1934. When sawmilling contracted in the mid 1970s the town's population reduced significantly.

Heritage listings
Jimna has a number of heritage-listed sites, including:
 Kilcoy-Murgon Road: Jimna Fire Tower
 4 Tip Road: former Jimna Single Men's Barracks

References

Towns in Queensland
Suburbs of Somerset Region
Populated places established in 1926
1926 establishments in Australia
Localities in Queensland